This is a list of states and union territories of India by the number of voters polled in the fifteen Lok Sabha elections between 1951 and 2009, based on data released by the Election Commission of India. In the 2009 general election, the Indian electorate was estimated to total approximately 714 million individuals, out of whom around 415 million cast a vote.

List

See also
 Elections in India

References

External links
 Votes Polled – Statewise (1951-2004) via IBN Live

Voters
Lists of subdivisions of India
Election-related lists
Voters